Hayashibara may refer to:

 Hayashibara Museum of Art
 Megumi Hayashibara